Fort St. Michael was a US Army installation in St. Michael, Alaska.

Fort St. Michael may also refer to:

St. Michael Fort, a fort in Ugljan, Croatia
Fort Saint Michael, a Hospitaller fort in Senglea, Malta
Fortress of São Miguel, a Portuguese fort in Luanda, Angola
Fort Sint-Michiel, a Spanish fort in Venlo, the Netherlands
Fort San Miguel, a Spanish fort in Vancouver Island, Canada